The Honda Fit (Japanese: ホンダ・フィット, Hepburn: Honda Fitto) or Honda Jazz is a small car manufactured and marketed by Honda since 2001 over four generations. It has a five-door hatchback body style and is considered a supermini in the United Kingdom, a subcompact car in the United States, and a light car in Australia. Marketed worldwide and manufactured at ten plants in eight countries, sales reached almost 5 million by mid-2013. Honda uses the "Jazz" nameplate in Europe, Oceania, the Middle East, Africa, Hong Kong, Macau, Southeast Asia and India; and "Fit" in Japan, Sri Lanka, China, Taiwan and the Americas.

Sharing Honda's global small car platform with the City, Airwave, first-generation Mobilio, Freed and HR-V/Vezel, the Fit is noted for its one-box or monospace design; forward-located fuel tank; configurable seats that fold in several ways to accommodate cargo in varying shapes and sizes— and cargo volume competitive to larger vehicles.

Honda released hybrid petrol-electric versions of the Fit in Japan in October 2010 and in Europe in early 2011. In 2012, Honda released the Fit EV, a limited-production all-electric version based on the second-generation model in the United States and Japan, and was widely regarded as a compliance car.

The fourth-generation model released in 2019 is currently sold in Japan, Europe, China, Taiwan, South Africa, and Singapore. Starting from 2020, the vehicle was phased out in most Southeast Asian and Latin American countries to be replaced by the larger City Hatchback, while it was withdrawn entirely from the North American market due to falling demand within the subcompact segment.

First generation (GD/GE; 2001) 

The first-generation Fit debuted in June 2001 in Japan and subsequently was introduced in Europe (early 2002), Australia (late 2002), South America (early 2003), South Africa and Southeast Asia (2003), China (September 2004), and Mexico (late 2005). Confusingly, in Europe this Jazz is typically referred to as Mark II Jazz, especially by automotive part suppliers, the Mark I Jazz being the 1981-86 Honda City, named 'Jazz' in Europe at the time.

A production model for the United States and Canada debuted in January 2006 at the North American International Auto Show in Detroit. The car was released in Canada and the U.S. in April 2006 as a 2007 model year.

The first-generation Fit uses Honda's Global Small Car platform, which is also used by Fit Aria/City (a sedan version of the Fit), the Airwave (a station wagon version of Fit Aria/City), the Mobilio, and Mobilio Spike. Depending on the region, the Fit is available with a 1.2-, 1.3- (in Europe referred as 1.4 L model), 1.5-liter i-DSI engine, or 1.5-liter VTEC engine. All four engines are based on Honda's L-series engine family.

Second generation (GE/GG; 2007) 

The second-generation Fit/Jazz debuted on 17 October 2007 at the 40th Tokyo Motor Show. At its introduction in 2007, it won the Car of the Year Japan Award for the second time. The vehicle offered a longer wheelbase than its predecessor and is wider and longer overall.

Two engines were offered in the second-generation Fit. The hybrid version was launched October 2010 in Japan. The Fit Hybrid featured a 1.3-litre engine and electric motor, with an estimated fuel economy of  measured in accordance with Japanese 10–15 cycle.

Honda also showed a concept electric vehicle based on the second generation Fit in 2010. It was mass-produced as the Fit EV in 2013–2015. The 2013 model year production Fit EV was unveiled at the November 2011 Los Angeles Auto Show.

For the first time, it was also available in a station wagon body style called the Fit Shuttle. The variant was only available in Japan's domestic market.

Third generation (GK/GH/GP; 2013) 

The third-generation Fit/Jazz retains the overall design concept of previous generations, notably the center-located fuel tank and multi-configuration interior concept, marketed as "Magic Seat". The model also debuted Honda's updated design language dubbed "Exciting H Design".

Honda's all-new Global Small Car Platform employing ultra-high strength 780 MPa yield steel for 27% of its bodywork — and a shorter overall length (-1.6 inches (-4 cm)), longer wheelbase (+1.2inch (+3 cm)) increased rear legroom (+4.8 inches(+12.2 cm)) and increased passenger volume (+4.9 cu ft (+135.9L)) compared to its previous generation.

Body panels are both welded and bolted to the frame in a hybrid monocoque and spaceframe fusion — and rear torsion beam suspension is more compact, no longer using an anti-sway bar to maximize interior and cargo space. The second-generation HR-V shares its platform with the third-generation Fit/Jazz.

Hybrid 
The Fit/Jazz Hybrid was only marketed in Japan and Malaysia for the third-generation model. It is the first model to be equipped with the "Sport Hybrid" Intelligent Dual Clutch Drive (i-DCD) system, Honda's lightweight and compact one-motor hybrid technology for small vehicles that replaces the previous Integrated Motor Assist (IMA) hybrid system.

The system are shared with the second-generation Vezel and Grace Hybrid.

Compared to the outgoing IMA hybrid, the new hybrid can now run fully on electric while driving, making it on par with Toyota Prius. Japanese cycle fuel consumption is rated  for the initial model, a 35 percent improvement over the predecessor model, while its cargo capacity is 470 liters.

Markets

Japan
Japanese models went on sale on 6 September 2013. Models available in Japan range from the 13G, 15X, RS and hybrid.

Non-hybrid models include the 13G (Earth Dreams 1.3-liter Atkinson cycle DOHC i-VTEC engine and CVT transmission), 15X (Earth Dreams 1.5-liter direct injection DOHC i-VTEC engine), RS (Earth Dreams 1.5-liter direct injection DOHC i-VTEC engine). The RS variant, like the outgoing model, features cosmetic enhancements featuring a sporty all-round body kit, 16-inch wheels, red interior stitching and sports pedals.

North America
The U.S. model debuted at the 2014 North American International Auto Show and went on sale in June as a 2015 model year vehicle. The third-generation model replaces the previous SOHC engine with an all-new 1.5-liter DOHC i-VTEC engine featuring direct injection and an intake cam using continuously variable cam phasing with a variable lift dual cam lobe profile. Transmission options include a 6-speed manual or continuously variable transmission (CVT) with available paddle shifters adopted from the Civic.  Fuel mileage ratings for automatic models are 33/41/36 mpg (LX model, city/highway/combined) or 32/38/35 mpg (EX and EX-L trim levels).

Unlike the previous generation, whose only two trims were Fit and Fit Sport, there are now four trims: LX, EX, EX-L, and EX-L with Navigation. For the first time, leather seating is introduced to the North American Fit through the EX-L trim. All Fit trim levels include a multi-angle rear-view backup camera; higher trims include dynamic guidelines. Honda's LaneWatch passenger side-view mirror camera is also optional.

A commemorative edition to celebrate the end of the Honda Fit for the Mexican market named "Final Edition" was launched on 1 December 2020. It is painted in the Azul Sport (Sport Blue) colour, equipped with side wings, a rear spoiler, and a commemorative plaque.

Malaysia
The Malaysian-market third-generation Jazz is available in S, E, and V trims. Regardless of trim level, all variants get a non-direct-injected 1.5-liter L15Z SOHC i-VTEC engine an Earth Dreams CVT.

Honda launched the facelifted Jazz and its Hybrid version in June 2017. Malaysia is the only country other than Japan to sell the Jazz Sport Hybrid. Honda gives 8-year unlimited mileage warranty on the battery.

Production in Malaysia ceased in October 2021. Like in most Southeast Asian countries, the new City Hatchback served as the Jazz replacement for Malaysian market.

Indonesia
The third-generation Jazz was launched by Honda Prospect Motor on June 26, 2014. It is equipped with the non-direct-injected 1.5-liter L15ZC engine and offered in three trims: the A, S, and RS, with either manual or CVT transmission, and a special edition called Black Top Limited Edition which was launched at the 22nd Indonesia International Motor Show in September 2014. It underwent two minor changes, first in 2016 where it was fitted with a new "floating" audio head unit design, added padding on passenger airbag, and redesigned wheel. On July 26, 2017, the RS is fitted with new LED headlights and underwent some cosmetic changes.

India
The third-generation Jazz was released in India on July 8, 2015. India is the first and the only market, where the Jazz has been offered in diesel. The diesel engine is mated to a six-speed manual transmission. The hatchback has been offered in 5 regular variants (E, S, SV, V and VX) in manual transmission and 2 variants (S and V) in CVT (continuously variable transmission). The upper V trim in CVT comes with first in segment, steering mounted paddle shifters offering 7 virtual manual selection. In 2015, the Indian Jazz contains 90% local parts.

Philippines
In the Philippines, the third-generation Honda Jazz was launched in 2014 and is available in three trim levels; the base, which is the 1.5 E, was available in either 5-speed manual or CVT. The manual variant received a steel wheel rim cover, while the E CVT received a different wheel design; the high-end 1.5 VX and 1.5 VX+ variants received unique designed alloy wheels, a touchscreen panel with the AUX/USB connection, HDMI connectivity, HSA (hill start assist), VSA (vehicle stability assist), a smart key with push start/stop button, automatic climate control, a mirror with side turning lights, and a center console with armrest and ESS (emergency stop signal). The VX+ received side-curtain airbags, and all models receive ECON button, sporty illumination gauge, and four types of modes: Utility, Long, Tall, and Refresh mode.

Facelift
The third-generation Fit/Jazz received a facelift, which was unveiled in Japan on May 12, 2017, and went on sale on June 29, 2017. It was also revealed in Thailand on May 19, 2017, followed by Malaysia on June 6, 2017, and the Philippines on July 17, 2017. The U.S. model was revealed on June 12, 2017, for the 2018 model year. The facelifted third-generation Jazz RS was also launched in Indonesia on July 26, 2017. The facelift features new bumpers for the 1.3L and 1.5L, LED headlights and daytime running lights incorporated into headlights.

Engines

Safety

North America

1 Vehicle structure rated "Acceptable"
2 Strength-to-weight ratio: 6.13

India

Latin America

ASEAN markets

Fourth generation (GR/GS; 2020) 

The fourth-generation Fit/Jazz was unveiled simultaneously on 23 October 2019 in Japan at the 46th Tokyo Motor Show and Amsterdam, Netherlands at the 'Electric Vision' event.

This generation model has been developed with electrification in mind, with the model being marketed as a hybrid-only model in Europe, and the hybrid variant being positioned as a volume car in Japan. The hybrid powertrain is marketed as the e:HEV which utilizes Honda's new dual-motor i-MMD (Intelligent Multi-Mode Drive) hybrid system, replacing the previous Intelligent Dual Clutch Drive (i-DCD) setup.

The fourth-generation Fit retains the large windshield which offers optimal forward visibility, though it has a redesigned front pillar with a cross-sectional structure that differs from the previous generation. Honda stated that it improves impact absorption into the body in the event of a collision. Combined with the use of a flat dashboard and a visor-less instrument display, it provides the driver with a better view of their surroundings. The windscreen wipers have also been hidden below the top of the bonnet line.

The model is not being sold in the North American market due to the declining sales of its predecessor; the HR-V has seen its production being ramped up to compensate for the discontinuation of the Fit. The model is also not being sold in Australia where it had been known as the Jazz. The cost was deemed too high for import, and the small car market has shrunk due to the popularity of small SUVs. In most countries in South America and Southeast Asia (except Singapore and Brunei), the Fit/Jazz is replaced by the City Hatchback.

Markets

Japan 
The Fit was launched in Japan on 13 February 2020 and went on sale on the following day. Initial trim levels for the Japanese market Fit were Basic, Home, Ness, Crosstar and Luxe.

In Japan, the Fit is offered with both conventional 1.3-litre petrol engine and the 1.5-litre e:HEV system. The take rate of the Fit e:HEV in Japan is targeted to reach 65 percent, up from the previous generation's 40 percent. In reality, the Fit e:HEV accounted for 72 percent of sales as per March 2020.

The Japanese market Fit received a facelift in August 2022, which reintroduced the RS trim (replacing Ness model). The facelifted model went on sale on 7 October 2022.

Europe 
The Jazz went on sale in Europe in mid-2020 as a hybrid-only model, as Honda is phasing out conventional combustion engines in the region by 2022. The Crosstar model is also offered as a range-topping model. For the market, Honda stated the Jazz is capable of achieving  on the WLTP combined cycle while emitting 102 g/km of CO2 in its standard form.

China 
The Chinese-market Fit is produced and sold by Guangqi Honda, and launched on 10 June 2020. It is available with two sub-models which are Sport and Crosstar. The Fit Sport featured sportier-looking front and rear bumpers compared to the Japanese or European model. Its twin model for the Chinese market is produced and sold by Dongfeng Honda under the name Honda Life.

The minor differences between the two are the front bumper designs and rear taillight tint colour (the Life has a clear smoked tint).

Both the Chinese-market Fit and Life is powered by a 1.5-liter i-VTEC engine to a CVT transmission. There is no hybrid option offered in China.

Others 
The fourth-generation Fit was launched in Singapore in January 2021 and in Hong Kong in March 2021 as the Jazz. It was also introduced in South Africa in June 2021 as the Fit, replacing the previous Jazz nameplate. The vehicle is also sold in some other countries such as New Zealand and Taiwan.

Powertrain 
The fourth-generation Fit is offered with a new hybrid powertrain option marketed as the e:HEV, the system uses Honda's dual-motor i-MMD (Intelligent Multi-Mode Drive) hybrid system. The engine sends power to the front wheels through a single fixed-gear ratio and a lock-up clutch, which is claimed to provide a smoother transfer of torque during acceleration. The setup is claimed to be more compact and refined compared to a planetary eCVT typically found in other hybrid vehicles.

The conventional petrol engine for the Japanese market is 1.3-litre naturally-aspirated i-VTEC four-cylinder, making 98 PS at 6,000 rpm and 118 Nm of torque at 5,000 rpm. It is mated to a CVT and a choice of either front or all-wheel drive.

Sales
Japanese sales of the first-generation Fit greatly exceeded the original monthly sales target of 8,000 units on debut. By December 2001, it had outsold the Toyota Corolla, and ranked first in sales for nine out of twelve months in 2002. With a total sales of 250,790 for the year of 2002, it became the best-selling vehicle in Japan, which is a first for a Honda model. By September 2003, a little more than two years after the car was first sold, Fit reached 500,000 sales in Japanese market.

After a minor model change that went on sale on June 11, 2004, Honda announced that, in about 2 weeks' period after its introduction, the company received orders from customers totaled around 13,000 units. By November 2007, in less than 6 months after minor model change, cumulative sales of Fit reached one million units in Japan.

The second generation has been the top selling car in Japan since its official launch in November 2007. By September 2010, cumulative sales in Japan reached 1.5 million units.

By December 2004, cumulative global sales of Fit/Jazz reached 1 million units. On July 17, 2007, Honda announced that as of the end of June more than 2 million Fit/Jazz units had been sold worldwide since its introduction. Japan accounts for the largest percentage of sales, with 962,000 units sold in the home market. Europe is next with 417,000 units. The United States accounts for 77,000 cars since introduction in 2006. Honda expected to sell 33,000 vehicles in the U.S. for the 2007 model year, but exceeded these expectations, and sold 40,000. Honda plans to put 70,000 Fit units on American roads for the 2008 model year.

In the first half of 2008, Honda and other manufacturers were surprised by the rapid shift towards smaller cars in the United States. Sales of the Fit during the first five months of the year jumped 64% compared with that of 2007. Production of 2009 Fit for the U.S. market was to increase from 60,000 to 80,000 cars. Further increase in supply for the U.S. market is limited by Honda's production capacity of 500,000 a year for all markets.

Honda announced that by the end of July 2009, worldwide sales of Fit/Jazz reached 3 million. One year later, global cumulative sales reached 3.5 million units in July 2010.

Marketing

Honda may have planned to use the name Fitta, and it was planned to be released in Japan under that name in 2001. Because Fitta in Scandinavian languages is slang for vagina, Honda instead used Jazz in most markets and Fit in the Americas.

In April 2006, Honda Australia promoted Honda Jazz with Village Green, an animated television commercial, in 30 second and 60 second versions, inspired by Thomas the Tank Engine. In the same month, American Honda launched the Fit with six five-second and two 30-second TV ads, with the slogan 'The Fit Is Go'.

Subsequent ad campaigns included "Mecha-Mosquitoes," (broke 9/21) "Defense Mechanism" (breaks 10/2) and "Bats" (breaks 9/28), produced by Digital Domain. As part of the campaign, the vehicle also appeared in Gossip Girl, 90210, America's Next Top Model, Smallville and Everybody Hates Chris. Print ads "Gas Hogs" and "Cavernous" were featured in popular magazines. A dedicated marketing site was built to communicate top product features through games and interactive experiences. The campaign continued the slogan 'The Fit Is Go'.

Awards and recognition
Japan Car of the Year for years 2001–02 and 2007–08
Japan Car of the Year 30th Anniversary Special Award "Best 3rd Decade Car": 1st generation Fit/Jazz
RJC Car of the Year Award 2002
Car and Driver'''s Best Small Car in its 2007–13 10 Best lists.
Top Gear Survey 2006: Best Small Car
Top Gear Survey 2006: Second Best of all cars in the survey (After the Honda S2000)
IGN Best of 2006 Awards: Killer B-segment Award
Greenercars.org's One of the Greenest Vehicles of 2007 and 2008
MotorWeek Drivers' Choice Awards 2007—Best Small Car
MotorWeek Drivers' Choice Awards 2007—Best of the Year
MotorWeek Drivers' Choice Awards 2009—Best Small Car
 Best Economy Car for 2008, U.S. News & World Report Top 10 Urban Vehicles for 2008 - Cars.com
2009 Car of the Year Finalist, Motor Trend2010 Best Overall Value by Consumer Reports
2010 Best Hatchback for the Money, U.S. News & World Report
2011 Best Overall Value by Consumer Reports
2012 Best Overall Value'' by Consumer Reports
2012 Best Cars for Families Awards - No. 1 in Affordable Small Cars

Racing
Honda Fit was one of the cars listed as eligible for the SCCA World Challenge's touring car B-spec class for the 2012 season onward.

Fit engines are also used in another SCCA class, the F1600 Championship Series.

See also
Honda City - the original 'Tall Boy' Honda Jazz sold in 1980s Europe
Honda EV Plus
Honda L-series engine

References

External links

Fit / Jazz at Honda Worldwide
Honda Fit official website(US)
Honda Electric Vehicles
Honda Fit Hybrid video at Honda World site
Honda recalls since 1977

Fit
Cars introduced in 2001
2010s cars
2020s cars
Subcompact cars
Hybrid electric cars
Production electric cars
Hatchbacks
All-wheel-drive vehicles
Front-wheel-drive vehicles
ASEAN NCAP superminis
Euro NCAP superminis
Global NCAP superminis
Latin NCAP superminis
Vehicles with CVT transmission